Kosciusko Island is an island in the Alexander Archipelago of southeastern Alaska, United States. It lies near the northwest corner of Prince of Wales Island, just across the El Capitan Passage from the larger island.

The island is home to Mount Francis, Holbrook Mountain, and Tokeen Peak. It had a population of 52 persons as of the 2000 census, all in Edna Bay, its only populated town.

Kosciusko Island was named in 1879 by William H. Dall of the United States Coast and Geodetic Survey for Tadeusz Kościuszko.

The location of the long deserted village named Shakan is on the northwest coast of Kosciusko Island, not on nearby Shakan Island.

See also
Shakan Island
Edna Bay

Notes

References
Kosciusko Island: Blocks 1045 thru 1052, Census Tract 1, Prince of Wales-Outer Ketchikan Census Area, Alaska United States Census Bureau

Islands of the Alexander Archipelago
Islands of Prince of Wales–Hyder Census Area, Alaska
Polish-American history
Islands of Alaska
Islands of Unorganized Borough, Alaska